Asturodes is a genus of snout moths in the subfamily Spilomelinae of the family Crambidae. The genus is placed in the tribe Margaroniini.

It contains four species in the subtropical and tropical Americas.

The caterpillars of Asturodes feed on leaves of Rhamnaceae species, with A. fimbriauralis recorded from Colubrina arborescens.

Species 
 Asturodes bioalfae Solis in Solis, Phillips-Rodríguez, Hallwachs, Dapkey & Janzen, 2020, found in Costa Rica
 Asturodes encisoensis Solis in Solis, Phillips-Rodríguez, Hallwachs, Dapkey & Janzen, 2020, found in Costa Rica
 Asturodes fimbriauralis (Guenée, 1854), type species, reportedly found in Belize, Brazil, Costa Rica, Dominican Republic, Ecuador, Mexico, Panama, Puerto Rico, Suriname, Trinidad and Tobago, United States (Florida), and Peru. (but these sources predate the description of the other three species)
 Asturodes junkoshimurae Solis in Solis, Phillips-Rodríguez, Hallwachs, Dapkey & Janzen, 2020, found in Costa Rica

References

Spilomelinae
Monotypic moth genera
Crambidae genera
Moths of South America
Moths of Central America
Moths of the Caribbean
Taxa named by Hans Georg Amsel